On October 25, 2015, the whale watching boat Leviathan II capsized in the vicinity of Plover Reef off the coast of Vargas Island near Tofino, British Columbia, Canada.  The  vessel was struck by a breaking wave over the reefs and its sinking resulted in the deaths of 6 of its 27 passengers

The dead were identified as five men and one woman ranging in age between 18 and 76.  Five were British citizens, though two were also Canadian residents, and the sixth was an Australian citizen.  The Transportation Safety Board of Canada (TSB) said a wave flipped the ship when most of the passengers and crew were on the top deck, raising the center of gravity and making it easier to capsize.  The TSB released its final report in June 2017 recommending changes to emergency safety practices.  The TSB's recommendations included 1) better precautions from tour boat operators to identify and avoid hazardous waves, 2) that Transport Canada implement and oversee risk management guidelines, and 3) mandatory emergency beacons on seafaring vessels.

A plaque was later installed near the wharf in Tofino to commemorate those who died in the capsizing.

References

Leviathan II
2015 disasters in Canada